Viseu 2001 Associação Desportiva Social e Cultural  is a sports club based in the city of Viseu, Portugal. The futsal team of Viseu 2001 plays in the Portuguese Futsal First Division.

Futsal

Current squad

References

External links
 Official website
 Zerozero

Futsal clubs in Portugal